The 2016 Royal London One-Day Cup tournament was a limited overs cricket competition that formed part of the 2016 domestic cricket season in England and Wales. Matches were contested over 50 overs per side and have List A status. All eighteen First-class counties competed in the tournament. Defending champions Gloucestershire went out in the group stage, as Warwickshire Bears  beat Surrey in the final.

Format 

The competition featured two groups of nine teams, with the top four teams from each group progressing to the quarter-finals. The groups for the 2016 season were based on a geographical split, with a North and South group.

Group stage

North Group

Table

Fixtures

South Group

Table

Fixtures

Knockout stage

Quarter-finals

Semi-finals

Final

See also
ECB 40

References

External links
Official Site

2016 in English cricket
Royal London One-Day Cup
Royal London One-Day Cup